The 1840 Philadelphia mayoral election saw John Swift reelected to office for his eighth overall non-consecutive term.

This was the first Philadelphia mayoral election in which the mayor wound up being solely elected by the general public. Since Swift received a majority in the general election, the City Council did not select the mayor. Beginning in 1839, the city operated under a mixed electoral system. Citizens voted for mayor in a general election. If a candidate receive a majority of the vote, they would be elected mayor. However, if no candidate received a majority, the City Council would select a mayor from the top-two finishers.

Results

References

1840
Philadelphia
Philadelphia mayoral
19th century in Philadelphia